Pohick Creek is a  tributary stream of the Potomac River in Fairfax County in the U.S. state of Virginia. It takes its name from the Pohick Native American tribe once prevalent in the area.

Pohick Creek forms in the vicinity of Burke and flows southeast past the western edge of Fort Belvoir to empty into the tidal Pohick Bay, which itself empties, along with Accotink Bay, into Gunston Cove, an embayment of the tidal Potomac River. Pohick Creek is a popular stream for whitewater kayaking, rafting, and paddling, providing Class II and III rapids along a  stretch between Hooes Road (Virginia Secondary Route 636) and the Richmond Highway (U.S. Route 1) at Lorton.

Several tributaries of the Pohick Creek are impounded by dams constructed under the Watershed Protection and Flood Prevention Act to prevent soil erosion and flooding. Originally eight dams were planned, but from 1970 to 1985, only six were actually built.
 Lake Braddock (Pohick #7) was the first dam built in 1970, and impounds the Pohick Creek in Burke.
 Huntsman Lake (Pohick #8) was built in 1973, and impounds the Middle Run in Springfield.
 Lake Royal (Pohick #4) was completed in 1977, and impounds the Rabbit Branch in Burke above its confluence with the Sideburn Branch, where it forms Pohick Creek.
 Lake Barton (Pohick #2) completed in 1978, impounds a tributary of the Sideburn Branch in Burke.
 Woodglen Lake (Pohick #3), which impounds the Sideburn Branch in Fairfax, was completed in 1981.
 Lake Mercer (Pohick #1) became in 1985 the final dam completed, impounding the South Run in Springfield.

Variant names
The following variant names have been listed on the Geographic Names Information System by the United States Geological Survey.

North West Branch 	
Poehick Creeke 	
Poheick Creek 	
West Branch

Course
Pohick Creek forms at the confluence of Rabbit Branch and Sideburn Branch in Burke, Virginia.  Pohick Creek Creek then flows southeast, forming the border between Burke and West Springfield.  After crossing the Fairfax County Parkway, it enters Newington and descends into a gorge where the Gerry Connolly Cross County Trail follows the creek, crossing it eight times.  It then passes into Lorton and crosses Interstate 95, the CSX RF&P Subdivision, and U.S. Route 1.  It then meets the Potomac River in Pohick Bay about 0.5 miles north of Springfield Farms.

Watershed
Pohick Creek drains  of area, receives about 43.5 in/year of precipitation, has a topographic wetness index of 409.88 and is about 31.0% forested.

See also
Accotink Bay Wildlife Refuge
List of rivers of Virginia
Pohick Church
Pohick, Virginia
SM-1 closed nuclear power plant on Fort Belvoir
MH-1A floating nuclear power plant

Maps

References

Rivers of Virginia
Rivers of Fairfax County, Virginia
Tributaries of the Potomac River